Nchum is one of the major Quarters of the Bafut Fondom in the Northwest Region of Cameroon.

Dr. Simon Awanchiri is vividly remembered for coordinating a series of developmental projects in this area, thanks to his collaborative work with the Canadian High commission in Yaoundé. Through this intermediary, the Quarter has seen developmental infrastructure like pipe-borne water and electricity.

To keep its youths disciplined and law abiding, Nchum is noted for its use of "keule mbang" or cracked palm nut shells, which the suspect is asked to kneel on for as long as it takes him/her to tell the truth. The practice is said to have curbed crime waves in this region down to as much as 60%.

Northwest Region (Cameroon)